Molotitsy is a rural locality (a selo) in Borisoglebskoye Rural Settlement, Muromsky District, Vladimir Oblast, Russia. The population was 1,192 as of 2010. There are 18 streets.

Geography 
Molotitsy is located on the Ushna River, 23 km north of Murom (the district's administrative centre) by road. Varezh is the nearest rural locality.

References 

Rural localities in Muromsky District
Muromsky Uyezd